Hibiscus lobatus, the lobed leaf mallow, is a species of flowering plant in the family Malvaceae. It is native to parts of the seasonally dry Old World Tropics, from Senegal in Africa to Hainan in China, and it has been introduced to Trinidad and Tobago. An annual with white (or yellow) flowers, it lacks the pseudo-sepals which are found in all Hibiscus.

References

lobatus
Flora of Senegal
Flora of Burkina Faso
Flora of Benin
Flora of Nigeria
Flora of Sudan
Flora of Ethiopia
Flora of Socotra
Flora of West-Central Tropical Africa
Flora of East Tropical Africa
Flora of South Tropical Africa
Flora of Botswana
Flora of Madagascar
Flora of Yemen
Flora of the Indian subcontinent
Flora of Myanmar
Flora of Thailand
Flora of Malaya
Flora of Hainan
Plants described in 1898